Saavedra is a Galician surname, meaning "Old Hall" (Lat. Sala Vetera > Saa Vedra; Sala is of Germanic origin), equivalent to Spanish Salavieja, which has exactly the same meaning. The loss of intervocalic L is characteristic of Galician-Portuguese. The surname Saa (Sá in modern Portuguese orthography) is also common.

Notable people with the surname include:
Abelardo Saavedra, American school district superintendent
Carlos Saavedra Gutiérrez (born 1986), Puerto Rican lawyer, Secretary of Labor of Puerto Rico (2017–2019)
Álvaro de Saavedra Cerón (dead 1529), Spanish explorer
Asya and Chloe Saavedra, American musicians, members of Chaos Chaos
Catalina Saavedra (born 1968), Chilean television and film actress
Cornelio Saavedra (1761–1829), Argentine soldier and politician
Cornelio Saavedra Rodríguez (1823–1891), Chilean soldier, grandson of Cornelio Saavedra
Craig Saavedra (born 1963), American film director
Daniel Ortega, full name José Daniel Ortega Saavedra (born 1945), Nicaraguan politician
Diego de Saavedra Fajardo (1584–1648), Spanish diplomat
Felipe Saavedra (born 1996), Chilean footballer
Francisco Saavedra de Sangronis (1746–1819), Spanish diplomat and administrator
Guillermo Saavedra (footballer) (1903–1957), Chilean footballer
Guillermo Saavedra (poet) (born 1960), Argentine poet
Héctor Puebla Saavedra (born 1955), Chilean footballer
Hernando Arias de Saavedra (1561–1634), governor of the Río de la Plata in 1592–1594, 1597–1599, 1602–1609, 1615–1617, 1617–1618
Ignacio Saavedra (born 1999), Chilean footballer
Igor Saavedra (born 1966), Chilean musician
José Alfredo Saavedra (born 1964), Honduran politician
José Vilalta Saavedra (1865–1912), Cuban sculptor
Luis Saavedra (1935–2013), Spanish footballer
Miguel de Cervantes Saavedra (1547–1616), Spanish writer, author of Don Quixote
Nélson Saavedra (born 1988), Chilean footballer
Omar Saavedra Santis (1944–2021), Chilean writer
Raúl Saavedra (born 1978), Argentinian football defender
Raúl Saavedra (cyclist) (born 1969), Colombian road cyclist
Sebastián Saavedra (born 1990), Colombian race car driver

Galician-language surnames